Cognition is the set of all mental abilities and processes related to knowledge, attention, memory and working memory, judgment and evaluation, reasoning and "computation", problem solving and decision making, comprehension and production of language, etc.

Cognitive may also refer to:

 Cognitive science, the interdisciplinary scientific study of the mind and its processes
 Cognitive psychology, the study of mental processes
 Cognitive bias, errors in perception.
 Cognitive behavioral therapy, a form of psychotherapy
 Cognitive Science Society, Society is a professional society for the interdisciplinary field of cognitive science
 Cognitive dissonance, the mental stress or discomfort experienced by an individual who holds two or more contradictory beliefs, ideas, or values at the same time
 Cognitive (album), the 2012 debut album of progressive metal supergroup Soen
 COGnitive Gaming, California-based professional video gaming esports team
Cognitive Liberty, an emergent legal theory that seeks to modernize "freedom of thought."

See also